Matthaea sancta is a species of plant in the Monimiaceae family. It is found in Indonesia, Malaysia, the Philippines, and Singapore.

References

Monimiaceae
Least concern plants
Taxonomy articles created by Polbot